Antilliaans Dagblad (The Antillean Daily) is a Dutch language daily morning newspaper distributed in the Dutch Caribbean islands of Aruba, Bonaire, Curaçao and Sint Maarten. The newspaper is the only Dutch-language newspaper on Curaçao together with Amigoe. The newspaper can be read partially online.

References

External links
 Antilliaans Dagblad website

Dutch-language newspapers
Newspapers published in Aruba
Newspapers published in Bonaire
Newspapers published in Curaçao
Newspapers published in Sint Maarten